Great Falls Dam is a hydroelectric dam on the Caney Fork, straddling the county line between White County and Warren County in the U.S. state of Tennessee. It is the only dam outside the Tennessee River watershed owned and operated by the Tennessee Valley Authority. The dam impounds the  Great Falls Lake, and its tailwaters feed into Center Hill Lake. The completion of Great Falls Dam in late 1916 was an engineering triumph, marking the first successful attempt to impound the volatile and flood-prone Caney Fork.
  
Great Falls Dam is named for the rapids and waterfalls on the Caney Fork downstream from the dam.  The section of river below the Power House is world-renowned for whitewater kayaking.  The dam and its tailwaters are surrounded by Rock Island State Park.

Location
The confluence of these two rivers (the Collins flowing from the southwest and the Caney Fork from the east) creates a peninsula. The two rivers nearly meet at the Narrows, a "land bridge" connecting the peninsula to the mainland.

Great Falls Reservoir stretches behind the dam for  along the Caney Fork and for roughly  along the lower Collins River. The lake also includes a small stretch of the lower Rocky River, which empties into the Caney Fork about a mile east of the dam.

Capacity

History

Throughout the 19th century, entrepreneur after entrepreneur attempted to harness the extraordinary hydro power potential of the Caney Fork only to be defeated by one of the volatile river's disastrous floods.  The first major establishment to utilize the river's power at Great Falls was the Bosson Mill, a gristmill and carding factory that operated at the site across the river from the Power House from the 1860s until its destruction by a flood in 1882. The most prominent venture at Great Falls Gorge was the Falls City Cotton Mill Company, which established a cotton mill and company town, Falls City, just above the gorge in 1892.  The company turned a moderate profit until 1902, when the Good Friday Flood destroyed its toll bridge and powerhouse, and the mill was forced to close (the mill and the town's "spring castle" are still standing, however).

By 1900, the rise of major industry in Nashville brought an increased demand for electricity. In 1901, Nashville entrepreneur Arthur Dyer formed the Great Falls Power Company and purchased land on the north side of the gorge with plans to build a dam. Dyer had trouble getting financing for the project, however, and in 1912 sold Great Falls Power to the Tennessee Power Company. At the Narrows, where the two tunnels are now located, an open channel was to be made from the Collins River to the Caney Fork. The powerhouse was to be located at least  by river below the present powerhouse. In so doing a total head of  would have been available;  at the dam,  between the dam and the present powerhouse and   around horseshoe bend.

With financing from Chicago business interests, Tennessee Power began construction work on the dam's foundation. Within a month, however, the Caney Fork burst its banks again, flooding out the project's excavation work and destroying its cofferdams. The plant went into operation on January 1, 1917.

In 1922, the Tennessee Power Company merged with several other entities to form the Tennessee Electric Power Company (TEPCO).  TEPCO tripled the capacity of Great Falls Dam by raising the dam  and installing a second generator at the powerhouse downstream.  The dam faced its first major test in March 1929, when several cloudbursts atop the Cumberland Plateau caused the Caney Fork to expand to record flood volumes, sending wreckage and uprooted trees crashing into the dam.  The Great Falls Power House was flooded and a substation was destroyed, but the dam held.

The passage of the TVA Act in 1933 gave the Tennessee Valley Authority oversight of flood control operations in the Tennessee River watershed, where most of TEPCO's dams were located.  Jo Conn Guild, the head of TEPCO, vehemently opposed TVA and challenged the constitutionality of the TVA Act in federal court.  After the U.S. Supreme Court upheld the act, however, TEPCO was forced under eminent domain to sell its assets to TVA for $78 million.  This sum included $3.5 million for Great Falls Dam.

After its acquisition, TVA almost immediately began making improvements to Great Falls Dam.  By 1946, grouting work had repaired much of the leakage through the cliffside, which had been an issue since the dam's creation.  TVA also built a new switchyard and control building.  In the late 1960s, the agency leased part of the Great Falls reservation to the state of Tennessee for the development of Rock Island State Park, which opened in 1969.

References

External links

Great Falls Reservoir — official TVA site
Rock Island State Park — official site

Buildings and structures in White County, Tennessee
Buildings and structures in Warren County, Tennessee
Dams in Tennessee
Dams on the National Register of Historic Places in Tennessee
Dams completed in 1917
Energy infrastructure completed in 1917
Historic districts on the National Register of Historic Places in Tennessee
Hydroelectric power plants in Tennessee
Tennessee Valley Authority dams
National Register of Historic Places in Warren County, Tennessee
1917 establishments in Tennessee